Sophie Maslow (March 22, 1911 – June 25, 2006) was an American choreographer, modern dancer and teacher, and founding member of New Dance Group. She was a first cousin of the American sculptor Leonard Baskin.

Born in New York City in 1911 by Russian American parents, Sophie Maslow began her dance training with Blanche Talmud at the Neighborhood Playhouse School. Her teachers there included Martha Graham and Louis Horst. She became a member of Martha Graham's Company in 1931, performing many solo roles, until 1943. She created her own dance troupe, The Sophie Maslow Dance Company and, with Jane Dudley and William Bales, established the Dudley-Maslow-Bales Trio in 1942. Ms. Maslow helped to define and establish New Dance Group as a performance entity dedicated to using dance to make social and political statements. In 1948, she performed and was a faculty member at the first American Dance Festival held at Connecticut College. 

Maslow's choreography includes: "Dust Bowl Ballads" which depicted the Depression of the 1930s and the people of the Southwest's endurance during these droughts, "Folksay" based on Carl Sandburg's poem of the same name, "Poem," with music by Duke Ellington and words by Lawrence Ferlinghetti, and the off-Broadway musical "The Big Winner" about a poor tailor and his winning lottery ticket. In 1951, she choreographed for the New York City Opera (The Dybbuk). In 1952, 1955, 1956, and 1960–62, Maslow choreographed the Hannukkah Festivals held at Madison Square Garden.

Her dances have been reconstructed and performed by CityDance Ensemble, The Harkness Ballet, The Batsheva Dance Company, and The Bat-Dor Company. Sophie Maslow's voice and altruism remain an inspiration for New Dance Group Arts Center.

Maslow was Jewish.

She died on June 25, 2006 in Manhattan at age 95.

Selected choreographic works
Themes from a Slavic People (1934) music: Béla Bartók
Two Songs About Lenin (1934)
May Day March (1936)
Runaway Rag (1938)
Silicosis Blues (1939)
Dust Bowl Ballads (1941) music: Woody Guthrie
Sarabande (1941)
Melancholia (1941)
Exhortation (1941)
Gigue (1941)
Bourée (1941)
Folksay (1942) music: Woody Guthrie, spoken text: The People, Yes by Carl Sandburg
Llanto (1944)
Champion (1948) music: Samuel Matlowsky
The Village I Knew (1950)
Four Sonnets (1951)
Snow Queen (1952)
Suite:Manhattan Transfer (1953)
Israel in Dance and Song (1953)
Celebration (1954)
The Gentleman from Cracow (1955)
Anniversary (1956)
Prologue (1959)
Poem (1963) music: Duke Ellington, poem by Lawrence Ferlinghetti
The Dybbuk (1964)
In the Beginning (1965)
Innovacation of David (1966)
Ladino Suite (1969)
Country Music (1971)
Touch the Earth (1973)
Decathlon Etude (1976)
Voices (1980) music: Robert Schumann
Woody Sez (1980) music: Woody Guthrie
From Louis' Book (1985) [music-bach]

References

 Anderson, Jack: The American Dance Festival.  Duke University Press, Durham 1987.()
Chujoy, Anatole. The Dance Encyclopedia. (Simon and Schuster, 1967) 
McDonagh, Don The Complete Guide to Modern Dance.( Doubleday and Company, 1976) 
Choreographer, Sophie Maslow, Dies at 95, The New York Times, June 26, 2006 Link

External links

1911 births
2006 deaths
20th-century American Jews
American choreographers
American people of Russian-Jewish descent
Modern dancers
21st-century American Jews